Joyce Ziske (born 1934 and also known as Joyce Ziske Malison) is an American professional golfer.

As an amateur, Ziske won the Wisconsin Women's Amateur twice and the North and South Women's Amateur. She played on the 1954 Curtis Cup team.

Ziske turned professional on February 8, 1955, and played on the LPGA Tour from 1955 to 1960. In 1960 she won the Women's Western Open which was one of the LPGA major championships at that time. She had her best finish in the U.S. Women's Open that same year, placing second. She retired from professional golf in 1960 after marrying Tom Malison in June 1961, but she played competitively at least once.

In 1975, she was elected to the Wisconsin Golf Hall of Fame.

Amateur wins
this list may be incomplete
1949 District Junior Girls Golf Invitational Tournament
1952 Milwaukee County Women's Tournament, Wisconsin Women's Amateur
1954 Palm Beach Women's Amateur, North and South Women's Amateur, Wisconsin Women's Amateur

Professional wins

LPGA Tour wins
1956 Syracuse Open
1959 Howard Johnson Invitational
1960 Wolverine Open, Women's Western Open

LPGA major is shown in bold.

Other wins
1960 Hoosier Celebrity

Major championships

Wins (1)

1 Won on second hole of sudden-death playoff.

Team appearances
Amateur
Curtis Cup (representing the United States): 1954 (winners)

References

External links
Wisconsin Golf Hall of Fame profile

American female golfers
LPGA Tour golfers
Winners of LPGA major golf championships
Golfers from Wisconsin
1934 births
Living people
21st-century American women